Ralph Nelson Elliott (28 July 1871 – 15 January 1948) was an American accountant and author, whose study of stock market data led him to develop the Wave Principle, a description of the cyclical nature of trader psychology and a form of technical analysis. It identifies trends and reversals in financial markets. These cyclical patterns in price movements are known among practitioners of the method as Elliott waves.

Personal life and career
Elliott was born in Marysville, Kansas, and later moved to San Antonio, Texas. He entered the accounting field in the mid-1890s and worked primarily in executive positions for railroad companies in Central America and Mexico. In 1903, Elliott married Mary Elizabeth Fitzpatrick (1869–1941), who accompanied him during his extended time working as an expatriate in Mexico. Civil unrest there brought the couple back to the United States and eventually to a residence in New York City, where Elliott started a successful consulting business.  In 1924, the United States Department of State appointed Elliott to the post of Chief Accountant for Nicaragua, which was under American control at the time.  Not long afterward, Elliott wrote two books based on his professional experiences: Tea Room and Cafeteria Management
and The Future of Latin America.

Elliott Wave Principle
In the early 1930s, Elliott began a systematic study of seventy-five years of stock market data, including index charts with increments ranging from yearly to half-hourly prices.  In August 1938, he detailed his results by publishing his third book in collaboration with Charles J. Collins, entitled The Wave Principle.  Elliott stated that, while stock market prices may appear random and unpredictable, they actually follow predictable, natural laws, and can be measured and forecast using Fibonacci numbers. Soon after the publication of The Wave Principle, Financial World magazine commissioned Elliott to write twelve articles under the book title, describing his method of market forecasting.

In the early 1940s, Elliott expanded the theory to apply to all collective human behavior. His final major work was his most comprehensive:  Nature's Law –The Secret of the Universe published in June, 1946, two years before he died.

In the years after Elliott's death, other practitioners, including Charles Collins, Hamilton Bolton, Richard Russell, and A.J. Frost continued to use the wave principle and provide forecasts to investors. Robert Prechter discovered Elliott's work as a market technician at Merrill Lynch, and used it as a basis for the book Elliott Wave Principle, coauthored with Frost in 1978. Prechter's prominence as a forecaster during the bull market of the 1980s helped bring the wave principle its greatest exposure up to that time.

See also
 The Elliott Wave Theorist
 Behavioral finance
 Daniel Kahneman

References 

1871 births
1948 deaths
People from Marysville, Kansas
American accountants
Technical analysts